Steven Thomas may refer to:

 Steven Thomas (sailor), Australian sailor
 Steven Thomas (entrepreneur) (1971–2008), American entrepreneur
 Steven Thomas (HIV), American convicted in Finland of infecting women with HIV
 Steven Thomas (basketball) (born 1981), American basketball player

See also 
 Steve Thomas (disambiguation)
 Stephen Thomas (disambiguation)